Zakhele Madida  (born May 26, 1980) professionally  known as Zakes Bantwini, is a South African singer, record producer and businessman. Born from KwaMashu F-section, KwaZulu-Natal, South Africa. He has worked with fellow musician Black Coffee, with whom he collaborated on the song "Juju".

Life and career

Early life and education 
Zakhele Madida was born and raised in kwaMashu F-section in the province of KwaZulu-Natal. He went to Shayamoya Junior Primary School and later attended Nqabakazulu High School. At the age of 14 years he had his first child. Despite facing the challenges of being a teenage father, he still went on to finishing his matric. After matriculating, he went on to study at Natal Technikon (now known as Durban University of Technology) where he received a national certificate in Light Music, this is also where he formed his own record label called Mayonie Productions while completing his final year. Madida received a diploma in Jazz and Music performance after completing his studies at the University of KwaZulu-Natal in Durban. He also studied a Social Entrepreneurship Programme at Gordon Institute of Business Science, University of Pretoria.

Career beginnings 
In April 2011, his single "Clap Your Hands" was released featuring Xolani Sithole.

2013-2016:The Fake Book and Real Book: My Music Bible 
In 2013, Madida released studio  album The Fake Book and Real Book: My Music Bible. The following year the album was nominated in the Best Dance Album Category at the 20th SAMA Awards. On 23 June 2017, he released the album Love, Light & Music 2.

In 2020, Bantwini remixed Lauv single "Modern Loneliness".

2021-present: Ghetto King,  upcoming album 

At Kunye Event he teased his single "Osama" with Kasango was teased. The song was scheduled  to be released on 17 September 2021. On September 2, 2021, it was reported  the release date of "Osama" was rescheduled to 10 September 2021. In September 10, his single "Osama" with Kasango was released. The song peaked number one on Radio Monitor Charts and spent 10 weeks on it. In late 2021, he headlined  to Miss South Africa 2021.

In early December 2021, Zakes' third studio album Ghetto King was released worldwide. The album  met positive review from music critics. It features Khetha, BlaQRhythm, DeeTheGeneral, Drega, Karyendasoul, Mthunzi, Nana Atta, Nomkhosi, Skillz, and Skye Wanda.

In early February 2022, Apple Music featured Zakes as 'Isigubhu' cover star.

In August 2022, Bantwini announced his upcoming studio album Abantu which is set to be released in November 2022.

Diploma and certificates 
 Diploma in Jazz & Popular Music : University of KwaZulu - Natal - 2012
 Certificate in Music Arrangement: Durban University of Technology - 2002
 Certificate in Film Music : Durban University of Technology - 2003
 Certificate in Social Entreprenuiship : Gordon Institute of Business Science - 2013

Business ventures 
In 2004, He established  Mayonie productions which is known for music such as Bum Bum, Wasting My Time and Clap Your Hands.

Madida released his debut album The Good Life in 2008. Two years later, he released the album Love, Light and Music which included songs such as "Clap Your Hands" and "Wasting My Time".

L'vovo Derrango 
In 2005, Madida helped launch the career of Kwaito artist Thokozani Ndlovu who was later known by his stage name L'vovo Derrango. Under Mayonie Productions, Derrango released his debut album which was self titled (Lvovo Derrango), the album gained him recognition as he was nominated at the SAMA Awards for the Best Kwaito Album. In 2007, he won the Best Kwaito and Song of the Year award at the MetroFM awards.

Personal life 
Madida has three children from previous relationships and two with his wife Nandi Madida (formerly Nandi Mngoma).

Discography

Albums

Awards and nominations

References 

1980 births
Zulu people
Living people
Kwaito musicians
South African jazz musicians
People from KwaZulu-Natal
Grammy Award winners